Peculiar Patients' Pranks is a 1915 American short comedy film featuring Harold Lloyd. Thought to be a lost film, it was rediscovered in Australia's National Film and Sound Archive in 1994.

Cast
 Harold Lloyd as Lonesome Luke
 Snub Pollard (as Harry Pollard)
 Gene Marsh 
 Bebe Daniels

See also
 Harold Lloyd filmography
 List of rediscovered films

References

External links

1915 films
American silent short films
1915 comedy films
1915 short films
1910s rediscovered films
American black-and-white films
Films directed by Hal Roach
Silent American comedy films
Lonesome Luke films
American comedy short films
Rediscovered American films
1910s American films
1910s English-language films